Rodrigo Julián Peñailillo Briceño (Concepción, born 12 December 1973) is a former Minister of the Interior of Chile.

References

External links
Minister of the Interior and Public Security - Gobierno de Chile

1973 births
Chilean Ministers of the Interior
People from Concepción, Chile
Living people
Chilean people of Spanish descent
Party for Democracy (Chile) politicians